Brooklyn Banks is the unofficial name for the area under the Manhattan side of the Brooklyn Bridge. The Brooklyn Banks are an original New York City skate spot, popular amongst the city's skateboarders and BMXers for its unique brick banks and other skateable features. Since the mid 2010s, the Banks have been inaccessible due to the area being used as a storage site for construction on the Brooklyn Bridge.

History
Starting in the late 1980s, significantly before any skateparks in New York City, the Brooklyn Banks provided one of the only banked skateable areas in the city.

The skateboard community has rallied to save the banks on multiple occasions. Led by skateboarder and community organizer Steve Rodriguez, New York City agreed to keep the larger banks for skateboarding in 2005. This movement occurred after the city remodeled over half of the skating spot, destroying the little banks. In 2020, after the New York City Department of Transportation removed all the bricks from the flat ground area, the skateboard community feared the big banks themselves will be next. , a petition to save the Brooklyn Banks garnered over 40,000 signatures.

Recreational use
Due to the terrain (smooth banked surfaces, with multiple objects such as benches, pillars, and stair rails), the area is popular with skateboarders and BMX riders for performing tricks.

In 2010 New York City turned the space into storage for a restoration project for the bridge. This effectively closed the area skateboarders had used for over twenty years. In 2016, a petition to re-open the banks was circulated with 21,718 signatures collected.

References

External links

 Brooklyn Banks 98-99
 Kyle James skating the Brooklyn Banks in "Tales From the Hood."
 Mike Carroll Lost Skateboarding Clip #38 Brooklyn Banks
 The Mecca of New York Skateboarding, Back From the Dead? - NYTimes - 2023

Skateboarding spots
Civic Center, Manhattan
Skateparks in New York City
Brooklyn Bridge